Michelle Carey may refer to

 Michelle Carey (athlete) (born 1981), Irish athlete 
 Michelle Carey (field hockey) (born 1999), Irish field hockey player